Second Ward Negro Elementary School, also known as the Second Ward Annex, is a historic school building located at Morgantown, Monongalia County, West Virginia. It was built in 1938–1939, and is a one-story, plus basement, "T"-shaped brick building in the Art Deco style. It sits on a sandstone foundation.  Funds for the building's construction were provided by the Works Progress Administration. It functioned as a school for African American students and a community center until the end of segregation in 1954.  The building reopened as a school annex and Instructional Materials Center in the 1960s, but ceased being used as a school in 1993.

It was listed on the National Register of Historic Places in 1992. It is located in the Greenmont Historic District, listed in 2005.

References

Art Deco architecture in West Virginia
Defunct schools in West Virginia
Educational institutions disestablished in 1954
Elementary schools in West Virginia
Former school buildings in the United States
Historically segregated African-American schools in West Virginia
Buildings and structures in Morgantown, West Virginia
School buildings completed in 1939
Schools in Monongalia County, West Virginia
School buildings on the National Register of Historic Places in West Virginia
Works Progress Administration in West Virginia
National Register of Historic Places in Monongalia County, West Virginia